Unity Bridge may refer to:

Unity Bridge, under construction, between Tanzania and Mozambique
Unity Bridge 2 upstream from the Unity Bridge, also between Tanzania and Mozambique
Unity Bridge (Lowell, Oregon), covered bridge in Oregon, U.S.